The South Taiwan monsoon rain forests ecoregion (WWF ID: IM0171) covers the southern tip of Taiwan, 200 km east of the mainland. The area is one of high biodiversity, due to its location between temperate and subtropical zones, its monsoon exposure, and its high altitude variation (from mangrove forests at sea level to inland mountains).

Location and description 
The ecoregion covers only the southernmost 60 km of the island, 70 km west to east at its widest. The central ridge is mountainous, with a flat coastal flat on the northwest. The ecoregion is only 1,000 square miles in area. Much of the southern tip of the island is protected by Kenting National Park. It is bounded on the north by the Taiwan subtropical evergreen forests ecoregion.

Climate 
The climate of the ecoregion is tropical monsoon (Köppen climate classification (Am)). This climate is characterized as having no month averaging below , and typically a very rainy wet season and relatively short dry season.

Flora and fauna 
The inland mountains support forests of both evergreen and deciduous trees. The evergreens include Chinese banyan (Ficus microcarpa) and Chinese cryptocarya (Cryptocarya chinensis); deciduous trees include Kapok (Bombax ceiba).  The coastal mangrove forests feature the Asiatic mangrove (Rhizophora mucronata) and Black mangrove (Bruguiera gymnorhiza).  The coastal areas support migratory birds on the East Asian–Australasian Flyway.

Conservation
A 2017 assessment found that 349 km², or 14%, of the ecoregion is in protected areas. Another 68% is forested but outside protected areas. Protected areas include:
 Kenting National Park
 Dawu Working Circle Taiwan Amentotaxus Nature Reserve
 Dawushan Nature Reserve
 Kenting Uplifted Coral Reefs Nature Reserve
 Xuhai-Guanyinbi Nature Reserve
 Dawu Taiwan Keteleeria Forest Reserve
 Chachayalaishan Major Wildlife Habitat
 Jin-shuei-ying Major Wildlife Habitat

See also 
 List of ecoregions in China

References 

Ecoregions of China
Ecoregions of Taiwan
Indomalayan ecoregions
Tropical and subtropical moist broadleaf forests